James Redfearn (1836 – 10 March 1916) was an Australian cricketer and horse trainer. He played one first-class cricket match for Victoria in 1862/63 and one for Otago in 1863/64.

Redfearn captained Otago to victory over Canterbury in 1863–64 in the first first-class match ever played in New Zealand. In the extremely low-scoring match his innings of 14 and 13 made him the second-highest scorer on either side.

Later he was prominent in horse-racing in Victoria. After running stables in Ararat, Geelong, and then Williamstown, he set up an establishment next to Melbourne's Caulfield Racecourse in 1888, and lived in nearby Glen Huntly. Among his successes, he bred and trained Malvolio, the winner of the Melbourne Cup in 1891; his son George was the jockey.

Redfearn married Elspeth Denham in the Victorian town of Streatham in October 1865. He died in Glen Huntly in March 1916.

See also
 List of Victoria first-class cricketers
 List of Otago representative cricketers

References

1836 births
1916 deaths
Australian cricketers
Otago cricketers
Victoria cricketers
Sportspeople from Yorkshire
Australian horse trainers
Australian racehorse owners and breeders
19th-century Australian businesspeople
People from Glen Huntly, Victoria
English emigrants to colonial Australia